"Italians, the good people" is a phrase coined by historians to refer to Italian popular beliefs about the allegedly limited, even non-existent, participation of Fascist Italy and the Royal Italian Army in the Holocaust and war crimes committed by Axis soldiers during World War II. The phenomenon is also known as the myth of the good Italian. 

A form of historical revisionism which emerged under the post-war republic, it was argued that Italian soldiers had been "good" or "decent people" (brava gente) who had acted with humanity and compassion, supposedly inherent Italian values, in contrast to their ideologically motivated and brutal German allies. In particular, it argued that the Italians had not participated in, or even opposed, the Nazi persecution of Jews in occupied parts of Eastern Europe. By extension, the term is sometimes applied to describe popular beliefs about the Italo-Ethiopian War (1935–6) or non-Jewish responses to the Holocaust in Italy.

Notable examples of the phenomenon in popular culture are the film Mediterraneo (1991) directed by Gabriele Salvatores and the novel Captain Corelli's Mandolin (1994) by Louis de Bernières which was also adapted into a film in 2004. The myth avoided "a public debate on collective responsibility, guilt and denial, repentance and pardon" but has recently been challenged by historians. The myth parallels the popular beliefs about the "Clean Wehrmacht" popular in post-war West Germany or the "victim theory" in Austria.

The 2012 report of the Italian-German Historical Commission noted that "Just as today the myth of the decent behavior of the Wehrmacht on Italian soil cannot survive in Germany, the survival of the myth of Italiani brava gente in reference to the Second World War is equally unacceptable."

References

Further reading

External links
Brava Gente? The Resurgence of the Shopworn Myth of Italian Benevolence During Fascism at i-Italy

Italian words and phrases
Italy in World War II
Historical controversies
Holocaust historiography
Historiography of Italy
Historical negationism